Glenview, California may refer to:

 Glenview, Lake County, California 
 Glenview, Los Angeles County, California
 Glenview, Oakland, California
 Glenview, San Diego County, California